Scrappy Happiness is an album by Joel Plaskett Emergency released on March 27, 2012. The album followed a unique release strategy, in which the band recorded one song each week for ten weeks, immediately releasing it for airplay on CBC Radio 2 and CBC Radio 3 and to iTunes for sale as a single, before releasing the 10 songs as a complete album in conventional formats on March 27.

Tour

Following the album's full release, Plaskett toured to support the album with supporting act Frank Turner.

The album was named as a longlisted nominee for the 2012 Polaris Music Prize on June 14, 2012.

Commercial performance
The album debuted at number 52 on the Canadian Albums Chart.

Track listing
In order of release:
 "You're Mine" - 3:59
 "Harbour Boys" - 3:26
 "Old Friends" - 4:08
 "Slow Dance" - 3:49
 "North Star" - 4:54
 "Somewhere Else" - 2:27
 "I'm Yours" - 3:33
 "Tough Love" - 3:42
 "Time Flies" - 3:50
 "Lightning Bolt" - 6:34

As sequenced on record:
 "Lightning Bolt" - 6:34
 "Harbour Boys" - 3:26
 "You're Mine" - 3:59
 "Tough Love" - 3:42
 "Slow Dance" - 3:49
 "Time Flies" - 3:50
 "Somewhere Else" - 2:27
 "Old Friends" - 4:08
 "I'm Yours" - 3:33
 "North Star" - 4:54

References

External links
Scrappy Happiness

2012 albums
Joel Plaskett albums